Corymbia xanthope, commonly known as Glen Geddes bloodwood, is a species of tree that is endemic to a small area of Queensland. It has thick, rough bark on the trunk and branches with yellow bark visible underneath, lance-shaped to curved adult leaves, flower buds in groups of seven, creamy white flowers and urn-shaped fruit.

Description
It has thick, rough, hard, tessellated bark on the trunk and branches with yellow bark visible underneath. Flower occurs from February to April and the flowers are creamy white.

Taxonomy and naming
Glen Geddes bloodwood was first formally described in 1989 by Anthony Bean and Ian Brooker and given the name Eucalyptus xanthope. In 1995 Ken Hill and Lawrie Johnson changed the name to Corymbia xanthope.

Distribution and habitat
Corymbia xanthope grows in woodland communities with Eucalyptus fibrosa on ridges or slopes with sandy soils. It is found on the central coast of Queensland north of Rockhampton.

Conservation status
This eucalypt is classified as "vulnerable" under the Australian Government Environment Protection and Biodiversity Conservation Act 1999 and the Queensland Government Nature Conservation Act 1992. The main threats to the species are destruction of trees and habitat disturbance caused by mining activities.

See also
List of Corymbia species

References

xanthope
Myrtales of Australia
Flora of Queensland
Plants described in 1989